BK Amager is a Danish basketball club based in the Kastrup suburb on Amager. Established in 1976, the team plays in the Basketligaen.

The club was founded in 1976 as Amager Basket, by two school teachers Benny Nielsen and Flemming Holm Jensen. In 2019, Amager joined the Basketligaen again after an absence of nine years.

References

External links
Official website

Basketball teams established in 1976
Basketball teams in Denmark